Jonathan Nanizayamo (born 21 February 1992) is a French footballer who plays for Union Titus Pétange as a forward.

Personal life
Nanizayamo is of Burundian and DR Congolese descent. He is the older brother of Ange Nanizayamo.

References

External links

1992 births
Living people
Sportspeople from Tours, France
Association football forwards
French footballers
French people of Burundian descent
French sportspeople of Democratic Republic of the Congo descent
Segunda División B players
Ligue 2 players
Championnat National players
Championnat National 2 players
Championnat National 3 players
K League 1 players
Belgian Third Division players
Luxembourg National Division players
Stade Rennais F.C. players
FC Nantes players
Real Sociedad footballers
Real Sociedad B footballers
FC Vereya players
Tours FC players
RC Lens players
Paris FC players
Gangwon FC players
US Quevilly-Rouen Métropole players
A.F.C. Tubize players
Union Titus Pétange players
French expatriate footballers
French expatriate sportspeople in Spain
French expatriate sportspeople in Bulgaria
French expatriate sportspeople in South Korea
French expatriate sportspeople in Belgium
French expatriate sportspeople in Luxembourg
Expatriate footballers in Spain
Expatriate footballers in Bulgaria
Expatriate footballers in South Korea
Expatriate footballers in Belgium
Expatriate footballers in Luxembourg
Footballers from Centre-Val de Loire
Black French sportspeople